Tibor Károlyi (born 15 November 1961) is a Hungarian chess International Master, International Arbiter (1997), coach, theoretician, and author.

Career
Károlyi won the open Hungarian Chess Championship in 1984 (the closed championship was won by Andras Adorjan). In 1989 he started his coaching career. Among his students were Peter Leko, Judit Polgár, Ildikó Mádl and Jason Goh Koon-Jong.

Károlyi has written numerous theoretical articles for New in Chess, but he is probably best known as author of popular chess books. His book Endgame Virtuoso Anatoly Karpov (co-authored with Nick Aplin) won The Guardian 2007 Chess Book of the Year award.

His handle on Playchess is "tkarolyi".

Notable games
 Garry Kasparov vs. Tibor Karolyi Jr., Dortmund 1980, Queen's Indian Defense: Kasparov–Petrosian Variation (E12), ½–½
 Mikhail Tal vs. Tibor Karolyi Jr., Tallinn 1985, Queen's Gambit Declined: Semi-Tarrasch Defense, Main Line (D42), ½–½
 Jaan Ehlvest vs. Tibor Karolyi Jr., Tallinn 1985, Spanish Game: Morphy Defense, Fianchetto Defense Deferred (C76), 0–1
 Andras Adorjan vs. Tibor Karolyi Jr., Ch Hungary (team) 1993, Zukertort Opening: Sicilian Invitation (A04), 0–1

Bibliography

References

External links

Tibor Karolyi chess games at 365Chess.com

Interview with Tibor Karolyi

Living people
1961 births
Chess International Masters
Chess theoreticians
Chess coaches
Chess arbiters
Hungarian chess players
Hungarian chess writers